Melieria acuticornis is a species of picture-winged fly in the family Ulidiidae.

References

acuticornis
Insects described in 1854